Magsaysay, officially the Municipality of Magsaysay,  is a 3rd class municipality in the province of Occidental Mindoro, Philippines. According to the 2020 census, it has a population of 39,767 people.

History 
Magsaysay was formerly as a part of San Jose. On April 3, 1969, it was created as a separate municipality by virtue of Republic Act 5459, signed by President Ferdinand Marcos.

Geography

Magsaysay, one of the eleven municipalities in the Occidental Mindoro, lies on the southernmost part of Mindoro Island, and is adjacent to the municipality of San Jose on the north; on the east separated by chain of valleys and mountains in the municipality of Bulalacao, Oriental Mindoro; on the south, by Garza Island; and on the west by Iling Island. It is facing the China Sea, with vast plains and valleys. It is characterized by rugged terrain with plain areas. Slope ranges from level to very steep sloping areas.  The highest point of elevation is 543 feet above sea level.

Magsaysay is characterized by rugged terrain with plain areas located at Barangays Calawag, Gapasan, Laste, Nicolas, Purnaga and Sibalat. Slope of 3-8 percent are observed in the surroundings of Barangays Alibog, Lourdes, Paclolo, Poblacion and Santa Teresa. It is drained by the Caguray River.

Slope ranges from level to very steeply sloping land. The highest point of elevation at 543 feet above sea level located at the north-east portion of Barangay Purnaga, which has slopes of 18 percent and above. Majority or 97.14 percent of the total land area falls below 18 percent slope, which is based on the Forestry Code can be classified Alienable and Disposable or areas that can be owned.  This manifests minimal limitation in terms of land development for land falling above 18 percent or land classified as forests have minimal share of only 2.86 percent.

The municipality has abundant water resource for domestic consumption and irrigation supply. Ground water serves as a main source of potable water supply including natural springs. Various river systems also traverse the locality, which is being utilized for irrigation such as Caguray River. In the same manner, it also serves as a natural drainage system in the locality.

Barangays

Magsaysay is politically subdivided into 12 barangays, one of which is classified urban and the rest are rural. Five barangays of the municipality are coastal barangays.

Climate

Demographics

Since 1970, total population has been continuously increasing with fluctuating growth rate.  The highest growth rate of 5.98 percent was noted between 1975 and 1980 while the least growth rate of 1.76 percent was recorded between 1985 and 1990.

Language
The municipality is home to the indigenous Ratagnon language of the Ratagnon people. The language is extremely endangered, with only 2 people speaking the language out of 2,000 Ratagnon residents. Due to government programs from the 1960s to 1970s, most Ratagnons have shifted to the Tagalog language, endangering their own culture. There has yet to be a revitalization program for the language. If no such program is made within the next 5–10 years, the language may be deemed as the first language of the Philippines that has gone extinct in the 21st century, and the fifth Philippine language to be extinct.

Economy

References

External links

Magsaysay Profile at PhilAtlas.com
[ Philippine Standard Geographic Code]
Philippine Census Information
Local Governance Performance Management System

Municipalities of Occidental Mindoro